A number of ships have been named Audacious, including:

 , several ships of the British Royal Navy
 , the former Italian cargo ship built in 1913 as Belvedere, seized by the United States in 1941 and scuttled in 1944 on the Normandy coast
 , a US Navy Stalwart-class ocean surveillance ship built in 1989, renamed from USNS Dauntless. She is now NRP Dom Carlos I (A522) of the Portuguese Navy.

See also
 French ship Audacieux, several ships of the French navy

Ship names